Ficta is an Oxford-based English vocal consort specialising in Medieval and Renaissance music, both secular and religious. It is a quintet founded by Grace Newcombe in 2009 in Oxford. Ficta has performed in concerts and recitals across Oxford, most recently collaborating with the Oxford University String Ensemble in a performance of Haydn's Salve Regina.

References 

Early music groups
Musical groups established in 2009
Early music consorts
Musical quintets